Grzegorz Kuświk (born 23 May 1987) is a Polish footballer who plays for Zenit Międzybórz.

Club career
On 3 October 2020, he signed with Stomil Olsztyn. On 29 September 2021, he moved to a sixth-division side Zenit Międzybórz, where he also serves as an assistant coach.

References

External links
 
 

1987 births
People from Ostrów Wielkopolski
Sportspeople from Greater Poland Voivodeship
Living people
Polish footballers
Association football forwards
GKS Bełchatów players
KS Polkowice players
Ruch Chorzów players
Lechia Gdańsk players
Stal Mielec players
Wisła Płock players
OKS Stomil Olsztyn players
Ekstraklasa players
I liga players